Japan Air Lines Flight 2 was a scheduled passenger flight on November 22, 1968. The plane was a new Douglas DC-8-62 named , flying from Tokyo International Airport (Haneda) to San Francisco International Airport (SFO). Due to heavy fog and other factors, Captain Kohei Asoh mistakenly ditched the plane near Coyote Point in the shallow waters of San Francisco Bay, two and a half miles short of the runway. None of the 96 passengers and 11 crew were injured in the landing.

Flight
Flight 2 was scheduled to depart Tokyo at 5 p.m. (0800 UTC) on Friday, November 22 and land in San Francisco at 10:15 a.m. (1715 UTC). Actual departure was delayed to 5:36 p.m. (0836 UTC) due to required maintenance on the pilot's instrument panel, which was providing inconsistent altitude readings. Command of the flight fell to Captain Kohei Asoh  (46), accompanied in the cockpit by first officer Captain Joseph Hazen  (34), flight engineer Richard Fahning (40), and navigator Ichiryo Suzuki (27). The flight was conducted without incident over the next eight hours. The aircraft serial number was 45954, built May 18, 1962 and delivered on May 27. It was equipped with four Pratt & Whitney JT3D-3B engines, which had a total operating time of 1707:54 hours.

As it approached its destination, JAL002 was picked up by local radar in Oakland at 8:54 a.m. Commanding pilot Captain Kohei Asoh attempted an automatic-coupled Instrument Landing System (ILS) approach due to the heavy fog, which he had never done before on a recorded DC-8-62 flight. (1712:54.3 UTC), then  at 9:14:11.3 a.m. (1714:11.3 UTC).

Less than a minute later, Captain Asoh requested that "due to the weather at San Francisco, we'd like a long final [approach], rather than direct to the outer marker", which would put the aircraft  to the east of the original landing path marker and provide a straighter approach to the runway. Under the ILS approach, the autopilot and flight director would be used to control the aircraft's heading and altitude. At 9:16 a.m. Updates were made to the flight's heading and altitude in response to air traffic control, and the final approach was commanded at 9:20:44 a.m. when Bay TRACON instructed JAL002 to make a left turn and assume a heading of 280° as they passed through the localizer in accordance with the ILS approach. In addition, because his pressure altimeter had been replaced prior to the start of the flight, Captain Asoh did not trust its readings, especially since it continued to disagree with the copilot's instrument, indicating a brief climb each time the aircraft had leveled off during the flight.

As a result, during the final descent, the too-low altitude was not recognized in time to correct it before hitting the water. He grabbed the control stick to gain altitude and advanced the throttles in anticipation of having to abort the landing and perform a go-around, but the plane's main landing gear had already struck the water, first right then left, approximately  short of Runway 28L. The plane landed in the water at approximately 9:24:25 a.m. (1724:25 UTC). Passenger Walter Dunbar recalled "We came in alongside the mountains and went into thick fog. The next thing I knew, we were about one foot off the water. She hit, skipped twice, then nosed up."

An early report from the Coast Guard stated the aircraft came to rest upside down. The chief purser, Kazuo Hashimoto, felt there was no panic amongst passengers after landing, and tried to make an announcement with the public address (PA) system. Since the PA system had failed after the landing, he ended up shouting from the forward cabin for passengers to "Be quiet, the plane has reached the bottom of the sea. It will not sink. Do not worry, we are well-fixed for evacuation." The passengers and crew all evacuated the plane on lifeboats, which were towed by police and Coast Guard boats to the nearby Coyote Point Yacht Harbor. Captain Asoh was the last to leave. Asoh returned to the plane after ensuring everyone was safely ashore to gather and return the passengers' personal belongings.

After the incident, the US National Transportation Safety Board (NTSB) stated it was the first successful ditching of a jetliner since the inauguration of jet service.

Investigation

Captain Asoh was a veteran pilot who had flown with Japan Air Lines for 14 years in 1968, with roughly 10,000 hours of flight time, 1,000 of them on DC-8s. During World War II he served as a flight instructor for the Japanese military. His first officer, Captain Joseph Hazen, had similar flight experience and served in the Marine Corps before flying for Air America from 1961 to 1968. Captain Asoh had 1,062 hours of flight time in the DC-8, while Captain Hazen had 18. After becoming familiarized with the DC-8-62 in April 1968, Captain Asoh piloted approximately one round-trip from Tokyo to San Francisco and back via Honolulu per month, starting in July. At the time, Captain Asoh stated (through a translator) that "the plane was fully automatic" and he couldn't "say what was wrong [to cause the water landing]" because he had been in contact with the control tower during the entire approach and was never informed he had deviated from the flight path.

According to the NTSB report, Captain Asoh failed to follow the published Japan Airlines procedures to perform an autopilot-controlled descent from the Woodside Vortac and subsequent automatic-coupled approach on ILS. Had the procedure been followed, the localizer first would be coupled, then the flight director/autopilot coupling system would permit the glide slope to be captured. In-cockpit instruments then should have been sufficient to warn the crew, more than three minutes before the water landing. Other JAL crews reported they were not trained in the use of the Sperry Flight Director System, resulting in revisions to the training program for flight crews. In addition, the language barrier between the commanding pilot and first officer could have been a contributing cause, as there was apparently insufficient "understanding, coordination, and confidence between crewmembers that the pilot flying the aircraft reacts to the other pilot's calls in a manner much the same as if he himself is looking through the other's eyes."

The "Asoh defense" 
When asked by the NTSB about the landing, Captain Asoh reportedly replied, "As you Americans say, I fucked up." In his 1988 book The Abilene Paradox, author Jerry B. Harvey termed this frank acceptance of blame the "Asoh defense", and the story and term have been taken up by a number of other management theorists.

Aftermath

The aircraft was not severely damaged and was recovered 55 hours after the incident at high tide, after several failed earlier attempts to hoist it out of the water. Bigge Drayage Company recovered the airplane using four crane barges; the primary lift was handled by two Smith-Rice 90-ton Dravo revolving cranes under the wings, while two Healy-Tibbitts 50-ton cranes were positioned fore and aft  to maintain the balance of the aircraft as it was lifted from the water. The forward crane was held in standby in case the load shifted due to movement of liquids inside the plane. A rig designed by Albert Kelly, named Air International Recovery (A.I.R.), was used during the salvage, equipped with lifting beams under each wing and a cradle for the nose.

After being transported to the airport, Shiga rolled off the barge on its own landing gear. External damage was extremely minor, as it had been noted that the only part of external equipment damaged on the aircraft was the right gear bogie, as one wheel had been sheared off when the plane ditched. Further inspections revealed only slight structural damage, with repairs estimated to take less than six months.

The aircraft was returned to JAL on March 31, 1969, and underwent a successful test flight on April 11, 1969, from San Francisco to Honolulu. It was later renamed  and continued in service to JAL until 1983.

Asoh was temporarily barred from passenger planes, demoted to First Officer, went through further ground training, and continued to fly for JAL until his retirement. Hazen also returned to flying a few months later.

By 1973 Japan Air Lines was using Boeing 747 aircraft on the Tokyo to San Francisco route. Today, Japan Airlines still operates a route named Flight 2 (JAL002) from Haneda to San Francisco, currently using the Boeing 777-300ER or Boeing 787-9.

Aircraft later history
JA8032 was sold to Air ABC (registration TF-BBF), then to Okada Air (registration 5N-AON), and finally flew as an express freighter for Airborne Express (registration ) before being decommissioned and scrapped at Wilmington Air Park (ILN) in December 2001.

See also

 Japan Air Lines Flight 350 – a DC-8 which ditched in Tokyo Bay short of Haneda in 1982
 Scandinavian Airlines System Flight 933 – a DC-8 which ditched in Santa Monica Bay short of LAX in 1969

Notes

References

External links
 
 Photograph in Flight International, Dec 5, 1968, showing the aircraft being lifted out of the water
 Smooth Landings and Stupid Travel News
 

Aviation accidents and incidents in the United States in 1968
Accidents and incidents involving the Douglas DC-8
Airliner accidents and incidents involving ditching
History of San Mateo County, California
2
Airliner accidents and incidents in California
1968 in California
November 1968 events in the United States
San Francisco International Airport